Geoffrey Maxwell Wheeler (21 May 1912 – 17 June 1941) was an Australian rules footballer who played with Hawthorn in the Victorian Football League (VFL). He played only one VFL game, against Melbourne.

Wheeler made a name for himself when he topped the Ballarat-Wimmera FL goalkicking with 108 goals in 1936. Hawthorn managed to secure a permit from Ballarat for Wheeler to play on a Monday.  He played on a split round weekend in which the Hawks and Melbourne played at Glenferrie oval. The following week he was dropped and lined up in the reserves. A few weeks later while playing in the seconds Wheeler had his arm broken and that finished his season.  He returned to Ballarat and he topped the goalkicking in 1938 and 1939 booting 93 goals on both occasions. Wheeler like many young men enlisted into the Army in 1940.

Military service
He enlisted in the Second AIF on 24 July 1940, and served in the 2/2 Pioneer Battalion.

Death
He was killed in action, at Merdjayoun, in French Lebanon, on 17 June 1941, serving with the Second AIF.

Family
The son of Herbert John Wheeler (1877–1947), and Eliza Lousia Wheeler (1878–1975), née James, Geoffrey Maxwell Wheeler was born at Coleraine, Victoria on 21 May 1912. He married Margaret Isabel Lingham (1914) in 1937. They had three children: Maxine, Alan, and Mabel.

See also
 List of Victorian Football League players who died in active service

Footnotes

Sources
 World War One Service Record: Private Herbert John Wheeler (5636), National Archives of Australia.
 Egyptian Toy Camel: Private G M Wheeler, 2/2 Pioneer Battalion, Collection of the Australian War Memorial.
 Roll of Honour: Private Geoffrey Maxwell Wheeler (VX45857), Australian War Memorial.
 Epic of The Pioneers: History Made at Merdjayoun, The Age, (Friday, 26 September 1941), p. 6.
 Private Geoffrey Maxwell Wheeler (VX45857), Commonwealth War Graves Commission.
 World War Two Nominal Roll: Private Geoffrey Maxwell Wheeler (VX45857), Department of Veterans' Affairs.
 Holmesby, Russell & Main, Jim (2007). The Encyclopedia of AFL Footballers. 7th ed. Melbourne: Bas Publishing.
 Quinlan, Kim, "Footy Stars of the Battlefield", The (Ballarat) Courier, 4 April 2002.

External links

1912 births
1941 deaths
Australian rules footballers from Victoria (Australia)
Hawthorn Football Club players
Ballarat Football Club players
Australian military personnel killed in World War II
Australian Army personnel of World War II
Australian Army soldiers